Oreodera curvata is a species of beetle in the family Cerambycidae. It was described by Martins and Monné in 1993.

References

Oreodera
Beetles described in 1993